The Great Stupa of Universal Compassion is a Buddhist monument near Bendigo in central Victoria, Australia. The basic idea for building the stupa came from Lama Yeshe and then, after Lama Yeshe's death, from Lama Zopa Rinpoche, who decided to model the stupa (kumbum) on the Great Stupa of Gyantse which is 600 years old. When completed, the stupa's exterior will be an exact replica of the Great Stupa of Gyantse. Buddhists say that viewing the stupa will help purify the mind.
 
The stupa has been designed to last 1,000 years. The interior has teaching rooms, a central temple, a library and 80 ornate shrine rooms. It houses the 2.5 metre Jade Buddha for Universal Peace statue, the world’s largest gem-quality jade Buddha statue. There is a vast collection of Asian sacred relics and statues on display at the stupa's exhibition centre.

See also
Great Compassion Mantra

References

External links
Official website
Jade Buddha for Universal Peace website 

Stupas
Buddhism in Australia
Buildings and structures in Bendigo
Buddhist temples in Australia
Bendigo